The 2016 FIM Ice Speedway Gladiators World Championship was the 2016 version of FIM Individual Ice Racing World Championship season. The world champion was determined by ten races hosted in five cities, Krasnogorsk, Almaty, Berlin, Assen and Inzell between 6 February and 20 March 2016.

Final Series

Classification

See also 
 2016 Team Ice Racing World Championship
 2016 Speedway Grand Prix in classic speedway

References 

Ice speedway competitions
World